Ladd is a village in Bureau County, Illinois, United States. The population was 1,236 at the 2020 census. It is part of the Ottawa Micropolitan Statistical Area. Ladd is most known for Rip's Tavern (which serves about 1,200 orders of fried chicken on a busy night), and for a Vietnam War tank located in the center of its park.

History
The settlement was originally named Osgood after the manager of the Whitebreast Fuel Company. The Whitebreast Fuel Company, based in Ottumwa, Iowa was the major coal supplier for the Chicago, Burlington, and Quincy Railroad. They set up the town in 1888. Ladd was incorporated on June 7, 1890, and was founded by George D. Ladd, a resident of Peru, Illinois. Ladd was originally named Laddville. The Ladd mine went bankrupt in 1901 and was purchased by the Illinois Third Vein Coal Company, owned by Samuel Dalzell of Spring Valley. At its height, the mine employed over 700 men and took an average of 1200 tons of coal a day from the ground. As a coal mining town, it is ethnically diverse with immigrants from Italy, Ireland, and Poland taking jobs at the mine. The mine closed in 1924.

In 2015 the village celebrated its 125th anniversary. The local grade school was replaced in the summer of 2003; prior to that the grade school occupied the building that originally housed Hall High School until the new school was constructed in 1911 in Spring Valley, at which time the old high school became the new Ladd C.C. School which had previously been a little three-room building behind the high school.

Geography
Ladd is located at  (41.381264, -89.216056), one mile north of Interstate 80 on Illinois Route 89. It is located between the village of Cherry to the north and the city of Spring Valley to the south.

Demographics

As of the 2020 census there were 1,263 people, 524 households, and 306 families residing in the village. The racial makeup of the village was 89.63% White, 0.24% African American, 0.08% Native American, 0.16% Asian, 3.88% from other races, and 6.02% from two or more races. Hispanic or Latino of any race were 10.06% of the population.

There were 524 households, out of which 33.78% had children under the age of 18 living with them, 52.86% were married couples living together, 3.44% had a female householder with no husband present, and 41.60% were non-families. 36.07% of all households were made up of individuals, and 11.07% had someone living alone who was 65 years of age or older. The average household size was 3.21 and the average family size was 2.37.

The village's age distribution consisted of 24.5% under the age of 18, 4.3% from 18 to 24, 25.4% from 25 to 44, 33.1% from 45 to 64, and 12.6% who were 65 years of age or older. The median age was 41.7 years. For every 100 females, there were 93.5 males. For every 100 females age 18 and over, there were 101.7 males.

The median income for a household in the village was $59,737, and the median income for a family was $87,632. Males had a median income of $60,125 versus $28,452 for females. The per capita income for the village was $29,588. About 6.2% of families and 9.3% of the population were below the poverty line, including 12.8% of those under age 18 and 5.7% of those age 65 or over.

Notable person
Henry J. Knauf, Illinois legislator and businessman, lived in Ladd.

References

External links

 Village of Ladd official website

Villages in Bureau County, Illinois
Villages in Illinois
Ottawa, IL Micropolitan Statistical Area
1890 establishments in Illinois
Populated places established in 1890